Tuntematon sotilas, Finnish for unknown soldier, may refer to:

The Unknown Soldier (novel), a 1954 novel by Väinö Linna
The Unknown Soldier (1955 film), a film adaption based on the novel by Väinö Linna, directed by Edvin Laine
The Unknown Soldier (1985 film), a film adaption based on the novel by Väinö Linna, directed by Rauni Mollberg
The Unknown Soldier (2017 film), a film adaption based on the unedited  (lit. A War Novel) version of the novel by Väinö Linna, directed by Aku Louhimies